Cajetan Fernandes (born 28 February 1989) is an Indian footballer who plays for Sporting Clube de Goa as a midfielder in I-League.

Career

Early career
Fernandes first hit the headlines when he scored India’s solitary goal in a 1–6 loss to Portugal at the 2009 Lusophony Games.

Fernandes attended Mãe de Pobres High School in Nuvem and started his youth career with Fransa Pax before moving onto Salgaocar at the age of 17.

Salgaocar
Cajetan won the I-league title with Salgaocar in 2010-11 and was instrumental in Karim Bencherifa's young Indian midfield. His most memorable moment came after scoring & winning the Man of the Match award as Salgaocar came from 2 goals down to beat East Bengal on their way to winning the I-league title. Cajetan also scored an 88th-minute goal for Salgaocar in Delhi as they beat Indian Arrows 3-1 away from home.

Sporting Goa
Fernandes made his debut for Sporting Goa in the I-League on 21 September 2013 against Mumbai F.C. at the Balewadi Sports Complex; as Sporting Goa drew the match 1–1.

Career statistics

Club

Honours

Club
 Salgaocar SC
 I-League (1): 2010–11
 Federation Cup (1) : 2011–12

 Sporting Club de Goa 
 Federation Cup (runners-up) : 2013-14

References

External links
 Cajetan Fernandes at Goal.com
 

1989 births
Living people
People from South Goa district
Footballers from Goa
Salgaocar FC players
I-League players
Sporting Clube de Goa players
Association football midfielders
Indian footballers